Fewer than 70 athletes are known to have played in both Major League Baseball (MLB) and the National Football League (NFL). This includes two Heisman Trophy winners (Vic Janowicz and Bo Jackson) and seven members of the Pro Football Hall of Fame (Red Badgro, Paddy Driscoll, George Halas, Ernie Nevers, Ace Parker, Jim Thorpe, and Deion Sanders). However, none of the players on the list has been inducted into the Baseball Hall of Fame.

In 1920, the inaugural season of the NFL, 11 veterans of MLB (including George Halas and Jim Thorpe) became the first athletes to accomplish the feat.  Since 1970, only seven athletes have done so, including Bo Jackson and Deion Sanders.  Jackson was the first athlete to be selected as an All-Star in both MLB and the NFL.  Sanders holds the longevity record, having appeared in 641 MLB games and 189 NFL games.

Overview

Since the formation of the National Football League (NFL), fewer than 70 athletes are known to have reached the highest level of play in both sports.

Early years
Christy Mathewson (MLB HOF) played Pro Football from 1898–1902. More than two-thirds of the athletes who played at the top level of both sports did so in the early years of the NFL during the 1920s and 1930s. The 1920 NFL season was the first in the league's history, and 11 veterans of Major League Baseball (MLB) participated in the inaugural campaign. The first group to appear in both sports included Jim Thorpe, a pioneer of professional football who began playing with the Canton Bulldogs in 1915. Thorpe was a Native American who grew up in the Sac and Fox Nation in Oklahoma. He was one of the most versatile athletes of his era, having won Olympic gold medals in 1912 for the pentathlon and decathlon and having also played professional basketball. Thorpe played in MLB from 1913 to 1919 and in the NFL from 1920 to 1928. He was later inducted into the Pro Football Hall of Fame.

The first group of MLB players to play in the NFL also included George Halas, who remained affiliated with the Chicago Bears as player, coach or owner from the 1920s until his death in 1983, Chuck Dressen, who later managed five Major League Baseball teams, including the Brooklyn Dodgers, from 1934 to 1966. and eight others (Lyle Bigbee, George Brickley, Garland Buckeye, Ralph Capron, Paul Des Jardien, Paddy Driscoll, Al Pierotti, and Tom Whelan).

Bert Kuczynski is one of a very small number of athletes to play Major League Baseball and in the NFL in the same year. In his senior year at Penn Kuczynski was on the NBC/Look Magazine 1942 All-American team as an end. After graduation in May 1943 he pitched in six games for the Philadelphia Athletics and played for the Detroit Lions in the 1943 NFL season. After two years in the Navy, in 1946 he played for the Philadelphia Eagles. While working on his master's degree in education at Penn, he was an assistant coach in the football program.

In 1954, former Ohio State star Vic Janowicz became the first Heisman Trophy winner to appear in both MLB and the NFL. After winning the Heisman in 1950, Janowicz played for baseball for the Pittsburgh Pirates from 1953 to 1954 and football for the Washington Redskins from 1954 to 1955.

Modern players

In 1987, Heisman Trophy winner Bo Jackson played for both the Los Angeles Raiders and the Kansas City Royals, becoming the first player to play in both MLB and the NFL since the 1960s. Jackson played eight years in Major League Baseball and four years in the NFL.  Jackson was also the first athlete to be named an All-Star in both sports.  His versatility led Nike, Inc. to develop its "Bo Knows" ad campaign in which Jackson was envisioned attempting to take up a litany of other sports, including tennis, golf, hockey, luge, auto racing, and even playing blues music with Bo Diddley, who scolded Jackson by telling him, "You don't know diddley!"

In 1989, two years after Jackson's accomplishment, Deion Sanders played baseball for the New York Yankees and football for the Atlanta Falcons.  Sanders had greater longevity playing in both sports than any other athlete in history, competing in Major League Baseball from 1989 to 2001 and in the NFL from 1989 to 2005. He led the National League with 14 triples in 1992 and finished second in the league in stolen bases twice: 1994 (38) and 1997 (56). Sanders also played in the 1992 World Series with the Atlanta Braves, hitting .533 in the series with five stolen bases in five attempts. He had a career batting average of .263, with 186 stolen bases and 43 triples in a nine-year career. In the NFL he was selected to play in eight Pro Bowls as a defensive back, and won two Super Bowls with the San Francisco 49ers and the Dallas Cowboys. Sanders had 53 career interceptions, returning 9 for touchdowns, and caught 60 passes for 784 yards and three touchdowns as a wide receiver. He was later inducted into the Pro Football Hall of Fame.

Brian Jordan is another notable two-sport athlete who played in both professional leagues. Jordan began his professional career in the NFL, playing three seasons as a safety for the Atlanta Falcons from 1989 to 1991. In his last two seasons in the NFL Jordan started 30 of 32 games and had 5 interceptions and 4 sacks and appeared in the 1991 playoffs with the Falcons. In 1992, Jordan switched to baseball and played 15 years as an outfielder from 1992 to 2006, mostly for the St. Louis Cardinals and Atlanta Braves. He had a career batting average of .282 with 1454 hits and 184 home runs. He was selected as an All-Star in 1999 and played in the World Series that same year. He appeared in post-season a total of five times,
hitting six home runs in 38 games.

The last player to accomplish the feat was Drew Henson, who was a third baseman for the New York Yankees from 2002 to 2003 and a quarterback for the Dallas Cowboys and Detroit Lions in 2004 and 2008.

In total, only seven players have accomplished the feat since 1970. They are Jackson, Sanders, Jordan, Henson, Chad Hutchinson, D.J. Dozier, and Matt Kinzer.

Notable omissions
Cal Hubbard is the only person to be inducted into both the Baseball Hall of Fame and the Pro Football Hall of Fame.  He played in the NFL from 1927 to 1936 and later served as an umpire in Major League Baseball.  As he was inducted into the Baseball Hall of Fame as an umpire, and never appeared as a player, he is not included on the list.

Greasy Neale is another person who gained fame in both sports but who is omitted from the list.  Neale played eight years in Major League Baseball, mostly for the Cincinnati Reds, from 1916 to 1924.  He also played for the Dayton Triangles in 1918 before the NFL was established.  He later served as the coach of the Philadelphia Eagles from 1941 to 1950 and has been inducted into both the Pro Football Hall of Fame and the College Football Hall of Fame.  However, he never appeared as a player in an official NFL game and is therefore not included in the list.

List of players

The following athletes have appeared in at least one game in both Major League Baseball and the National Football League.

References

National Football League
Major League Baseball